Amanita ponderosa, also known as heavy amidella or gurumelo in Spanish, is a mushroom-forming fungus in the family Amanitaceae.

References 

ponderosa
Fungi described in 1944